Roderick M. Morrison House, also known as Morrison-Wagener House, is a historic home located at Milo Center in Yates County, New York. It is a Roman Classical style structure built about 1825.

It was listed on the National Register of Historic Places in 1994.

Morrison was a lawyer from Virginia who moved to the area. George Wagner, the third owner of the home, is believed to have constructed the "secondary" wooden home attached to the main home's structure.

References

Houses on the National Register of Historic Places in New York (state)
Houses completed in 1825
Houses in Yates County, New York
National Register of Historic Places in Yates County, New York